The arrondissement of Annecy is an arrondissement of France in the Haute-Savoie department in the Auvergne-Rhône-Alpes region. It has 79 communes.

Composition

The communes of the arrondissement of Annecy, and their INSEE codes, are:
 
 Alby-sur-Chéran (74002)
 Alex (74003)
 Allèves (74004)
 Annecy (74010)
 Argonay (74019)
 La Balme-de-Sillingy (74026)
 La Balme-de-Thuy (74027)
 Bloye (74035)
 Bluffy (74036)
 Le Bouchet-Mont-Charvin (74045)
 Boussy (74046)
 Chainaz-les-Frasses (74054)
 Chapeiry (74061)
 La Chapelle-Saint-Maurice (74060)
 Charvonnex (74062)
 Chavanod (74067)
 Chevaline (74072)
 Choisy (74076)
 Les Clefs (74079)
 La Clusaz (74080)
 Crempigny-Bonneguête (74095)
 Cusy (74097)
 Cuvat (74098)
 Dingy-Saint-Clair (74102)
 Doussard (74104)
 Duingt (74108)
 Entrevernes (74111)
 Épagny-Metz-Tessy (74112)
 Étercy (74117)
 Faverges-Seythenex (74123)
 Fillière (74282)
 Giez (74135)
 Le Grand-Bornand (74136)
 Groisy (74137)
 Gruffy (74138)
 Hauteville-sur-Fier (74141)
 Héry-sur-Alby (74142)
 Lathuile (74147)
 Leschaux (74148)
 Lornay (74151)
 Lovagny (74152)
 Manigod (74160)
 Marcellaz-Albanais (74161)
 Marigny-Saint-Marcel (74165)
 Massingy (74170)
 Menthon-Saint-Bernard (74176)
 Mésigny (74179)
 Montagny-les-Lanches (74186)
 Moye (74192)
 Mûres (74194)
 Nâves-Parmelan (74198)
 Nonglard (74202)
 Poisy (74213)
 Quintal (74219)
 Rumilly (74225)
 Saint-Eustache (74232)
 Saint-Eusèbe (74231)
 Saint-Félix (74233)
 Saint-Ferréol (74234)
 Saint-Jean-de-Sixt (74239)
 Saint-Jorioz (74242)
 Saint-Sylvestre (74254)
 Sales (74255)
 Sallenôves (74257)
 Serraval (74265)
 Sevrier (74267)
 Sillingy (74272)
 Talloires-Montmin (74275)
 Thônes (74280)
 Thusy (74283)
 Val-de-Chaise (74167)
 Vallières-sur-Fier (74289)
 Vaulx (74292)
 Versonnex (74297)
 Veyrier-du-Lac (74299)
 Les Villards-sur-Thônes (74302)
 Villaz (74303)
 Villy-le-Pelloux (74307)
 Viuz-la-Chiésaz (74310)

History

The arrondissement of Annecy was created in 1860.

As a result of the reorganisation of the cantons of France which came into effect in 2015, the borders of the cantons are no longer related to the borders of the arrondissements. The cantons of the arrondissement of Annecy were, as of January 2015:

 Alby-sur-Chéran
 Annecy-Centre
 Annecy-le-Vieux
 Annecy-Nord-Est
 Annecy-Nord-Ouest
 Faverges
 Rumilly
 Seynod
 Thônes
 Thorens-Glières

References

Annecy
Annecy